Downtown Cincinnati is the central business district of Cincinnati, Ohio, as well the economic and symbiotic center of the Cincinnati metropolitan area. It also contains a number of urban neighborhoods in the low land area between the Ohio River and the high land areas of uptown. These neighborhoods include Over-the-Rhine, Pendleton, Queensgate, and West End.

Demographics
5,838 live in Downtown Cincinnati as of the 2020 Census. 

2000 data unavailable.

Urban Basin and its Demographics
The Urban Basin is the 4 square mile Urban Core of Cincinnati bounded by Mill Creek on the West, the Ohio River to the South, Gilbert and Eggelston on the East, and Liberty, McMicken and Harrison on the North. This was the common nickname given to the densely populated Urban core of Cincinnati in the 19th and 20th centuries. The basin was amongst the most densely populated areas of any city in the United States from 1860-1900. It remained a large share to the City of Cincinnati's overall population until Urban Renewal and Highways tore up much of urban fabric in the 1950s and 60s.

Geography
Downtown Cincinnati is laid out on a basin on the Ohio River, surrounded by steep hills. Downtown Cincinnati's streets are arranged on a grid. Streets are split between the east and west by Vine Street. Bridges from Downtown Cincinnati span the Ohio River across to Covington and Newport in Northern Kentucky.

Often considered to be the heart of Cincinnati, Fountain Square is located in the center of the Central Business District. The 1871 dedicated Tyler Davidson Fountain stands prominently on the often busy city square. Other city parks located Downtown are Lytle Park and Piatt Park. The Backstage District that sprang up around the Aronoff Center contains nightlife and dining options.

Cityscape
Downtown Cincinnati is marked by its large collection of historic architecture and contains several historic districts and dozens of buildings on the National Register of Historic Places listings in downtown Cincinnati, Ohio.

All but one of the twenty-five tallest buildings in Cincinnati are located in Downtown Cincinnati. The Carew Tower has a public observation deck on the forty-ninth floor.

Since 1971, the Cincinnati Skywalk has connected buildings throughout downtown via a series of primarily indoor, elevated walkways. The Skywalk was officially completed as a 1.3 mile contiguous path in 1997, but has since fallen into disfavor by city leaders, and some sections have been removed.

Culture
Downtown Cincinnati is an increasingly residential area with former commercial space, such as Park Place at Lytle, being converted into luxury condos. The population was 4,850 at the 2010 census.

Museums downtown include the high-rise Contemporary Arts Center, National Underground Railroad Freedom Center, and the Taft Museum of Art.

The Banks is a waterfront mixed-use development hosting bars and restaurants. It is especially crowded following games at the adjacent Paul Brown Stadium and Great American Ball Park, the stadiums of the Cincinnati Bengals and Cincinnati Reds.

Economy
Downtown has long been the economic hub of Cincinnati. In the mid-nineteenth century, 16 of the city's 24 banks were located on Third Street near the busy Public Landing river port.  Towards the end of the nineteenth century, the center of business activity moved to Fourth Street, closer to where it remains today.

Kroger, Fifth Third Bank, Procter & Gamble, Western & Southern Financial Group, American Financial Group, and Cincinnati Bell are all headquartered in Downtown Cincinnati.

The Duke Energy Convention Center is the convention center of Cincinnati. Opened in 1968, it offers  of meeting space.

Local government
The historic Cincinnati City Hall is located downtown on Plum Street. The Hamilton County Courthouse is connected to the Hamilton County Justice Center via a skybridge.

Media
The Cincinnati Enquirer, the daily citywide newspaper, has its headquarters downtown, as does the alternative newspaper Cincinnati CityBeat.

Transportation
Downtown is a transportation hub for the entire region. Downtown is served by Fort Washington Way which connects interstates 71 and 75 with Route 50.

Southwest Ohio Regional Transit Authority operates public transportation with its transit hub at Government Square. The downtown area is also served by the Cincinnati Bell Connector, a streetcar line that connects downtown with Over-the-Rhine.

See also

Mount Adams, Cincinnati
Over-the-Rhine

References

External links
Downtown Residents Council

Neighborhoods in Cincinnati
Cincinnati